Sweet Lovely is an album by David Murray released on the Italian Black Saint label in 1980. It features performances by Murray, Fred Hopkins and Steve McCall.

Reception
The Allmusic review by Scott Yanow states, "Murray stretches out on four of his originals (which clock in between eight and twelve-and-a-half minutes) and shows plenty of fire but also a healthy dose of lyricism. This is exciting music very much in the avant-garde".

Track listing
 "Coney Island" – 9:27
 "Corazón" – 8:29
 "The Hill" – 12:29
 "Hope Scope" – 8:00
All compositions by David Murray
Recorded at Barigozzi Studios, Milano, December 4 & 5, 1979

Personnel
David Murray: tenor saxophone
Fred Hopkins: bass
Steve McCall: drums

References

1980 albums
David Murray (saxophonist) albums
Black Saint/Soul Note albums